Elachista pelaena is a moth of the family Elachistidae. It is found in the United States, where it has been recorded from California.

References

pelaena
Moths described in 1996
Moths of North America